Irene Paredes Hernández (born 4 July 1991) is a Spanish professional footballer who plays as a centre-back for Liga F club Barcelona and captains the Spain national team.

Club career

Real Sociedad
Born in Legazpi, Gipuzkoa in the Basque Country, Paredes joined local side Zarautz in 2007. She then moved to Real Sociedad a year later. On 5 October 2008, she made her senior debut against Málaga in a league game.

Athletic Bilbao
After spending three seasons at Real Sociedad, Paredes signed for Basque rivals Athletic Bilbao in 2011. She spent five seasons there, winning the Primera División in her final season with the club in 2015–16. She also won three Copa Euskal Herria against her former club Real Sociedad in 2011, 2013 and 2015. On 10 June 2012, she was sent off for the first time in her career in their 1–2 loss against Espanyol in the 2012 Copa de la Reina final.

Paris Saint-Germain
In 2016, Paredes signed for Paris Saint-Germain. She played her first UEFA Women's Champions League season after joining PSG and reached the final, where her team lost 6–7 on penalties to Lyon.

On 31 May 2018, she won her first trophy with the club as PSG defeated Lyon 1–0 in the final of the 2018 Coupe de France Féminine. She was named as captain of PSG before the start of the 2018–19 season.

In May 2019, Paredes extended her contract with PSG for two more years, keeping her at the club till 30 June 2021. On 21 September, Paredes played in her first final as captain as PSG were defeated 3–4 on penalties by Lyon in the inaugural Trophée des Championnes.

On 4 June 2021, Paredes led PSG to their first ever league title, ending Lyon's run of 14 consecutive titles. She also led PSG to the semifinals of the Women's Champions League where her team lost to eventual champions Barcelona.

Barcelona
On 8 July 2021, Paredes signed a two-year deal with Barcelona after her contract with PSG expired. On 4 September, Paredes made her official Barcelona debut in a 5–0 routing of Granadilla Tenerife. On 17 October, Paredes scored her first goal for Barcelona in a 5–0 victory against Sporting Huelva. On 17 November, she scored her first Women's Champions League goal for Barcelona as she headed in the second goal in a 5–0 defeat of 1899 Hoffenheim in the group stage.

On 23 January 2022, Paredes won her first title with Barcelona after her side thrashed Atlético Madrid 7–0 in the final to win their second Supercopa de España Femenina title. On 9 February, Paredes returned after recovering from Covid-19 and scored the fourth goal in the 9–1 thrashing of Real Sociedad. On 13 February, Paredes suffered a muscle tear in her left thigh during their 3–0 win against Athletic Bilbao and was ruled out for over four weeks. On 13 March, Paredes won her second Spanish league title, and her first with Barça, after Barcelona won 5–0 against Real Madrid. On 22 March, Paredes returned from her injury when she came on at the 65th minute in a 3–1 victory against Real Madrid in the first leg of the Champions League quarter final. On 30 March, she made her Camp Nou debut in the return leg of Barça's 5–2 quarter final victory against Real Madrid. On 21 May, Paredes started against Lyon as Barcelona were defeated 1–3 in the Champions League final at the Allianz Stadium in Turín. On 29 May, she won her third trophy with Barcelona as her team thrashed Sporting Huelva 6–1 in the Copa de la Reina final.

On 18 August, Paredes was announced as the fifth captain of Barcelona before the start of the new season.

On 19 January 2023, Paredes was sent-off during Barcelona's 3–1 victory over Real Madrid in the semi-final of the 2022-23 Supercopa de España Femenina and was subsequently suspended for the final. Three days later, her side defeated Real Sociedad 3–0 to win the trophy. On 27 January, Paredes extended her contract with Barcelona until June 2025.

International career
She played her first minutes for the Spain national team in November 2011 against Romania. In June 2013, national team coach Ignacio Quereda confirmed Paredes as a member of his 23-player squad for the UEFA Women's Euro 2013 finals in Sweden. At the tournament, she scored an unfortunate own goal in Spain's 3–1 quarter-final defeat to Norway. On 27 October 2013, she scored her first goal for Spain, in a 6–0 home win against Estonia at a 2015 FIFA Women's World Cup qualification match. On 5 March 2018, she marked her 50th appearance for Spain by opening the scoring with a header in a 2–0 victory against Czech Republic in the last group match of the Cyprus Cup.

As of October 2021, Paredes is the captain of the Spanish national team, together with former Barcelona teammate Jennifer Hermoso, who is the vice-captain and Barcelona captain Alexia Putellas, who is the third captain.

On 14 February 2022, Paredes was ruled out of the inaugural edition of the Arnold Clark Cup after suffering a muscle tear in her left thigh and was replaced by Sheila García.

Personal life
Paredes is in a relationship with former Spain hockey player Lucía Ybarra. During her stint at PSG, the couple lived together in Saint-Germain-en-Laye.

In April 2021, Paredes and Ybarra announced that they were expecting their first child together. On 13 September, Paredes announced the arrival of their son Mateo, who was born the day before, in an Instagram post. Paredes had already asked coach Jorge Vilda not to summon her to the national squad for 2023 FIFA Women's World Cup qualification due to the forthcoming birth.

Style of play
Paredes has been described to be a multifaceted defender, who is a commanding presence in the air. She is also a very skillful and technically gifted ball-playing defender as she contributes to her team's build-up while dribbling the ball up the field and connecting with the attackers. She is an attacking threat inside the opponent's penalty area from free-kicks and corners as she has demonstrated with her prowess in goalscoring through headers.

Career statistics

Club

International
Scores and results list Spain's goal tally first, score column indicates score after each Paredes goal.

Honours
Athletic Bilbao
 Primera División: 2015–16

Paris Saint-Germain
 Division 1 Féminine: 2020–21
 Coupe de France Féminine: 2017–18

Barcelona
 Primera División: 2021–22
 Copa de la Reina: 2021–22
 Supercopa de España Femenina: 2021–22, 2022–23

Spain
 Algarve Cup: 2017
 Cyprus Cup: 2018

Individual
 Algarve Cup Best player: 2017
 FIFA FIFPro World XI: 2017
 UEFA Women's Champions League Squad of the Season: 2020–21
 UEFA Women's Champions League Defender of the Season: 2020–21

References

External links
 
 
 Irene Paredes at FC Barcelona
  (archive)
 Irene Paredes at BDFutbol
 
 
 

1991 births
Living people
People from Goierri
Footballers from the Basque Country (autonomous community)
Spanish women's footballers
Spain women's international footballers
Primera División (women) players
Real Sociedad (women) players
Athletic Club Femenino players
Paris Saint-Germain Féminine players
FC Barcelona Femení players
Women's association football defenders
2015 FIFA Women's World Cup players
Expatriate women's footballers in France
Spanish expatriate sportspeople in France
Division 1 Féminine players
2019 FIFA Women's World Cup players
LGBT association football players
Spanish LGBT sportspeople
Sportspeople from Gipuzkoa
UEFA Women's Euro 2022 players
UEFA Women's Euro 2017 players
21st-century Spanish women